Girl on Fire or Girls on Fire may refer to:

Books
"The Girl on Fire", a name used to refer to the Hunger Games character Katniss Everdeen
Edie: Girl on Fire, a 2007 biography of Edie Sedgwick
Girls on Fire, a 2016 novel by Robin Wasserman

Music
Girl On Fire (band), a rock band from Seattle, Washington
Girl on Fire (album), a 2012 album by Alicia Keys
"Girl on Fire" (song), a 2012 song by Alicia Keys from the album
"Girl on Fire", a song by Rob Zombie on his 2003 album Past, Present & Future
"Girls on Fire", song by Nadine from Nadine (EP)
Girls on Fire, band from X Factor (Poland series 3)